Hidden Homicide is a 1959 British mystery film directed by Anthony Young and written by Bill Luckwell and Anthony Young. It is based on the 1951 novel Death at Shinglestrand by Paul Capon. The film stars Griffith Jones, Patricia Laffan, James Kenney, Bruce Seton, Peter Carver and Danny Green. The film was released on 25 February 1959 by Rank Film Distributors.

Plot
Writer Michael Cornforth (Griffiths Jones) wakes up in a strange house in the countryside – fully clothed and holding a gun. On investigating, he discovers his cousin's dead body in the kitchen, and soon finds himself accused of murder.

Cast
Griffith Jones as Michael Cornforth
Patricia Laffan as Jean Gilson
James Kenney as Oswald Castellan
Bruce Seton as Bill Dodd
Peter Carver as Wally Gizzard
Danny Green as Cliff Darby
Charles Farrell as Mungo Peddy
John Moore as The Stranger
Richard Shaw as Wright
Robert Raglan as Ashbury
Maya Koumani as Marian Savage
David Chivers as The Chemist
Norman Wynne as The Innkeeper
Frank Hawkins as Ben Leacock
Jan Wilson as Porter
Joe Wadham as Marshall
John Watson as Policeman

References

External links
 

1959 films
British mystery films
1950s mystery films
1950s English-language films
1950s British films